The 1994 Light 'n' Lively Doubles Championships was a women's tennis tournament played on outdoor clay courts at the Saddlebrook Golf & Tennis Resort in Wesley Chapel, Florida in the United States that was part of the 1994 WTA Tour. The tournament was held from March 24 through March 27, 1994.

Finals

Doubles

 Jana Novotná /  Arantxa Sánchez Vicario defeated  Gigi Fernández /  Natasha Zvereva 6–2, 7–5
 It was Novotná's 2nd title of the year and the 57th of her career. It was Sánchez Vicario's 2nd title of the year and the 40th of her career.

Light 'n' Lively Doubles Championships
WTA Doubles Championships
March 1994 sports events in the United States
1994 in American tennis